Gaspéite, a very rare nickel carbonate mineral, with the formula , is named for the place it was first described, in the Gaspé Peninsula, Québec, Canada. 

Gaspéite is the nickel rich member of the calcite group. A solid solution series exists between all members of this group with divalent cations readily exchanged within the common crystal structure. It forms massive to reniform papillary aggregates in fractures, botryoidal concretions in laterite or fracture infill. It is also present as stains and patinas on iron oxide boxworks of gossanous material.

Paragenesis 
Gaspéite is formed in the regolith as a supergene enrichment mineral of hypogene nickel sulfide minerals, generally in arid or semi-arid environments which produce conditions amenable to concentration of calcareous or carbonate minerals in the weathering profile. 

Gaspéite from Widgiemooltha is associated with talc carbonated komatiite-associated nickel sulfide gossans and is probably formed by substitution of nickel into carbonates such as magnesite which are formed by oxidation of the talc-carbonate lithology, and of primary and supergene nickel sulfide minerals. 

Gaspéite is formed from a similar process to the weathering of other sulfide minerals to form carbonate minerals. The sulfide minerals which are weathered to produce gaspéite are pentlandite, violarite, millerite and rarely nickeline.

Occurrence 
Gaspéite is known from a handful of locations worldwide. Aside from its type locality in Canada, gaspéite is found in the nickeliferous gossans of Kambalda type komatiitic nickel ore deposits in Kambalda, and nearby Widgie Townsite, Widgiemooltha, both south of Kalgoorlie, Western Australia, in both locations also associated with garnierite and kambaldaite.

Nickel carbonate, though not conclusively proven to be gaspéite, is also reported in hydrothermally altered ultramafic rocks in New South Wales, Australia, associated with serpentinite bodies and lode gold deposits.

Gaspéite is reported from the Lord Brassey Mine, Tasmania, in association with hellyerite.

Uses 
Gaspéite presence in the geologic environment may be used as an ore mining indicator of nickel rich minerals nearby.
 
Gaspéite stones are used for carving ornamental objects and animal figurines, and are also cut and polished into attractive apple green color (often veined) cabochons for jewelry use.

References 

 
 
 

Nickel minerals
Carbonate minerals
Trigonal minerals
Minerals in space group 167